Pueblo Nuevo District is one of the six districts of the Ferreñafe Province in Peru.

External links
  www.munipueblonuevo.gob.pe Official district web site

References